= Rio de Janeiro 2016 =

Rio de Janeiro 2016 may refer to:

- 2016 Summer Olympics, officially branded as Rio 2016
- 2016 Summer Paralympics
